Kannamangalam may refer to:
 Kannamangalam, Malappuram, a panchayath in Malappuram District, Kerala state, India
 Kannamangalam (Alappuzha), a village in Kerala state, India
 Kannamangalam (Sivaganga district), a village in Tamilnadu state, India